{
  "type": "FeatureCollection",
  "features": [
    {
      "type": "Feature",
      "properties": {},
      "geometry": {
        "type": "Point",
        "coordinates": [
          -90.0675490871072,
          32.33692580111283
        ]
      }
    }
  ]
}Market Street Flowood is an outdoor shopping mall in Flowood, Mississippi. It is managed and leased by Trademark Property Company. It has two anchor tenants. This shopping mall contains many upscale dining restaurants. It is across the street from nearby outdoor mall Dogwood Festival Market. It is on the other corner of Lakeland Drive (MS 25) and East Metro Parkway.

Dining 

 Amerigo
 Berry Berry Good Frozen Yogurt
 Buffalo Wild Wings
 Corner Bakery Cafe (Closed 2020)
 Five Guys
 Gigi’s Cupcakes
 Great American Cookies
 Outback Steakhouse
 Smoothie King
 Sombra Mexican Kitchen

Anchor tenants 
 JCPenney
Dicks Sporting Goods

References

Shopping malls in Mississippi
Year of establishment missing
Buildings and structures in Rankin County, Mississippi